Manipal is a suburb and university town within Udupi, in coastal Karnataka, India. Manipal is located five kilometres away from the centre of Udupi City, in Udupi District, Karnataka (state) in south western India. It is administered by the Udupi City Municipality. The suburb is located in coastal Karnataka, 62 km north of Mangalore and  8 km east of the Arabian Sea. From its location on a plateau, at an altitude of about 75 m above sea level, it commands a panoramic view of the Arabian Sea to the west and the Western Ghats to the east. 

Home to the Manipal Academy of Higher Education, the town attracts more than twenty five thousand students every year and hence most of the population is students or university staff. It is one of the most cosmopolitan towns of India, reflected in its numerous cafes attracting students and faculty from around 60 countries. There are numerous spots throughout the suburb that attract students from nearby Mangalore and Udupi such as End Point, Manipal Lake and Malpe Beach. The city owes its rapid development to Manipal Academy of Higher Education for converting this into a student city. It is called "Campus Town" by the locals.

A regional information technology hub, Manipal has one of the highest densities of mobile phones in India.

Etymology
Manipal derives its name from 'Manna Palla (Kannada: ಮಣ್ಣ ಪಳ್ಳ) (meaning "muddy hole" or "muddy lake" in Tulu) commonly called Manipal Lake, a freshwater lake within Manipal.

Location
Now it is part of Udupi city. The name is derived from "munn" and "palla", anglicised to Manipal . Munn means "mud" and palla means "lake" in Tulu language. The Swarna river passes just north of Manipal. Recreational facilities are available through End Point Park and Tree Park.

Manipal was once a barren hill with few trees. This hill was transformed into the university town it now is by Dr. T. M. A. Pai, who first started the Kasturba Medical College in 1953, now a part of the university, the Manipal Academy of Higher Education (MAHE). Tourist spots like Agumbe, Kudremukh, Kapu and Malpe are also located nearby.

Climate
From September to February, the weather in Manipal is tropical with daily temperatures averaging .
Being away from large urban centers and the highly tropical climate of the town attracts a large number of birds, with 155 different species of birds being recorded in February 2015, including rarities such as the Tickell's Thrush, Blue-eared Kingfisher and Slaty-breasted Rail.

Transport

Road
Manipal is connected to Mangalore (takes about 75 minutes via road) and towns such as Udupi, Karkala and Kundapur by several private bus services and KSRTC City Buses which run every thirty minutes. The town also has overnight bus services to Bangalore, Hyderabad, Goa and Mumbai.

There are also buses which connect to the famous nearby tourist attractions like Malpe beach, Delta Beach, Dharmasthala.

Karnataka State Road Transport Corporation runs air-conditioned bus service between Mangalore International Airport and Manipal.

Rail
The nearest railway station is Udupi station (UD) on the Konkan Railway line, located four kilometres west of Manipal. It has trains connecting Mumbai, Goa, Kerala, New Delhi, Gujarat, Rajasthan, Uttar Pradesh, Madhya Pradesh, Haryana, Tamil Nadu, Uttarakhand, Punjab. It is about a kilometer away from the National Highway 169A.

Air
Pre-paid taxis are available to transport passengers to and from Manipal and Udupi.

Buses also connect Manipal directly to the Kempegowda International Airport in Bangalore, to cater to the large number of international students studying at the university. KSRTC recently started "Flybus", a premium daily bus service from Manipal to Kempegowda International Airport in Bangalore.

Education
 

Manipal gained prominence when Dr. T.M.A. Pai founded the Kasturba Medical College in 1953, the Manipal Institute of Technology in 1957, a popular institute for engineering and 21 other colleges later, all of which became a part of Manipal Academy of Higher Education in 1993. Manipal Academy of Higher Education has been granted the status of Institute of Eminence in the year 2018. It has also been ranked among the top ten private engineering colleges within India. It is ranked 2nd within the state of Karnataka. Pai also founded the Manipal Pre-University College.

Manipal is a major technology and medical research hub, with major conferences and seminars organized almost every week. Since the establishment of Manipal University Technology and Business Incubator (MUTBI), the in-house business incubator of the university, a large number of student-run technology and media startups have sprung up.

See also
 List of twin towns and sister cities in India
 Mangalore
 Udupi
 Chikmagalur

References

External links

 
Populated places in the Western Ghats
Cities and towns in Udupi district